The men's 10,000 metres event at the 2002 World Junior Championships in Athletics was held in Kingston, Jamaica, at the National Stadium in Independence Park, on 20 July.

Medalists

Results

Final
20 July

Participation
According to an unofficial count, 20 athletes from 14 countries participated in the event.

References

10,000 metres
Long distance running at the World Athletics U20 Championships